Villem Tammai (8 March 1892 Vändra, Pärnu County – 24 June 1973 Tallinn) was an Estonian politician. He was a member of IV Riigikogu. He was a member of the Riigikogu since 9 May 1931. He replaced Maksim Unt.

References

1892 births
1973 deaths
Members of the Riigikogu, 1929–1932
People from Vändra